Southern Ndebele may refer to:
Southern Ndebele people
Southern Ndebele language

Language and nationality disambiguation pages